Heinz König (25 December 1927 – 21 November 2002) was a German researcher, economist and former professor for Economy and Econometrics at the University of Mannheim from 1962 to 1996. Moreover, he served as President (Rektor) of the University of Mannheim between 1979 and 1982. In addition, König was founding director of the Zentrum für Europäische Wirtschaftsforschung (ZEW).

Education
He studied from 1948 to 1951 economics and business administration at the University of Mainz where he obtained his Diplom-Volkswirt (former German master's equivalent) in 1951. Afterwards, he obtained his PhD in Economy/Econometrics at the same university in 1953—in his dissertation König concentrated on the Circular flow of income and Input–output model (Original Title: Wirtschaftskreislaufmodelle und die Methode der Input-Output-Analyse). König worked as research assistant at the Institute for Economics and Social Sciences of the University of Münster where he completed his habilitation in 1958. Between 1958/1959 he was Rockefeller Fellow at the Massachusetts Institute of Technology (MIT), Harvard University and Stanford University.

Academics
He worked from 1962 until his retirement in 1996 as chaired professor at the University of Mannheim. Over the years of his academic work he received several other proposal from universities in Bochum (1964), Münster (1966), Zürich (1966 and 1971), Bonn (1970), Munich (1971) and Vienna (1974) which he turned down.
From 1991 to 1998, König served as director of the Institute für Mittelstandsforschung (Institute for Small- and Medium Sized Companies) at the UMA, where he conducted research on the German Mittelstand. Moreover, König was visiting professor at the University of Basel (1963), the Northwestern University (1979–1982) and the University of Pennsylvania (1983). He became emeritus at the University of Mannheim in 1996. König co-founded the ZEW in 1991 and served as its first director until 1997.

Heinz König Young Scholar Award
The Heinz König Young Scholar Award is named after ZEW's late founding director Heinz König. It awards excellent empirical papers by young researchers. Every year, the Heinz König Young Scholar Award is given to the author of the best paper presented at the end of the annual ZEW Summer Workshop. The price is endowed with €5,000.

Selected publications

See also
 List of University of Mannheim people

Notes

External links
 Literature from and about Heinz König

1927 births
2002 deaths
Academic staff of the University of Mannheim
Academic staff of Johannes Gutenberg University Mainz
Academic staff of the University of Münster
German economists
Fellows of the Econometric Society
Officers Crosses of the Order of Merit of the Federal Republic of Germany